Spydeberg was a municipality in former Østfold county, Norway, until December 31. 2019. At January 1. 2020 it became a part of the new and greater municipality named "Indre Østfold Kommune" after the region, together with Askim and Trøgstad and Eidsberg and Hobøl kommuner (Municipalities).

The administrative centre of the Spydeberg municipality was the village of Spydeberg. Spydeberg Kommune (municipality) was divided into the parishes of Spydeberg, Heli, and Hovin and was established as a municipality on 1 January 1838 (see formannskapsdistrikt).

The village of Spydeberg has approximately 5,500 inhabitants. At the most there used to be 16 daily buses to Oslo (the capital of Norway), and about 21 train departures. Like the rest of the Indre Østfold region, many of the citizens of Spydeberg commute daily to Oslo for work.

General information

Name 
The municipality (originally the parish) is named after the old Spydeberg farm (Old Norse: Spjótaberg), since the first church was built here. The first element is the plural genitive case of spjót which means "spear" and the last element is berg which means "mountain". The word "spear" is here probably referring to some outstanding points of a nearby mountain.

Coat-of-arms 
The coat-of-arms is from modern times. They were granted on 30 June 1978. The arms show three canting silver spear points (from the word spyd which comes from the Old Norse word spjót) on a red background. The model for the spear points was unearthed at a burial mound near Mørk in 1905. The three spears represent the three parishes in the municipality. It was designed by Truls Nygaard.

Notable residents

Sister cities 
The municipality of Spydeberg has been quite active in international relations for over 20 years. The town has sister cities in Denmark, Sweden, and Latvia.

  Thyholm, Midtjylland, Denmark
  Straupe, Pārgauja, Latvia
  Kungsör, Västmanland, Sweden

References

External links 
 
 
 
 Municipal fact sheet from Statistics Norway

 
Municipalities of Østfold
Villages in Østfold